The Mona ground iguana (Cyclura stejnegeri) is a critically-endangered species of rock iguana, endemic to Mona Island, Puerto Rico. It is one of the island nation’s few large land animals, and it is the largest endemic terrestrial lizard in the country, and one of the biggest rock iguanas within the Antilles. It was previously considered a subspecies of the rhinoceros iguana (Cyclura cornuta).

Taxonomy
The Mona ground iguana belongs to the genus Cyclura. It was named by Thomas Barbour and Gladwyn Kingsley Noble as a species in 1916. In 1937, Thomas Barbour considered it to be a subspecies of Cyclura cornuta, although he doubted it was particularly distinct. He was followed for the next 60 years. Research into scalation patterns in 1977 found little difference between this taxon and the nominotypical subspecies, but markedly more differences in subspecies onchiopsis, and thus found Barbour's 1937 taxonomic interpretation best approximated the obvious relatedness of these taxa. Its specific name, stejnegeri honors Leonhard Hess Stejneger, who, when writing his Herpetology of Porto Rico in 1902, suspected the rhinoceros iguanas of Mona Island might be slightly different in scale count than those in Haiti, although he was unsure.

In 1993 Robert Powell suggested that all three subspecies of the rhinoceros iguana could be seen as distinct species, if the word "species" was redefined to mean any population which was separated from another population. Although it does not appear to be distinct from the nominotypical subspecies morphologically, in a 1999 article, Powell again recommended recognising this population as a different species, based on what he had said in 1993. Some authorities have decided to follow Powell. Still, others consider it a regional variant of the parent species, C. cornuta.

Description

The Mona ground iguana is a large-bodied, heavy-headed lizard with strong legs and a vertically flattened tail, which is capable of reaching  in length (from snout to tail). A crest of pointed, horned scales extends from the nape of the neck to the tip of the tail. The color is a uniform gray to olive drab, with slight brown or blue colorations. Juveniles differ from adults in that they have gray transverse bands across their bodies. These bands last until they are sexually mature at about three years of age.

Males possess bony, prominent tubercles on their snouts resembling horns, adipose pads in the form of a helmet on the occipital region of their heads, and large dewlaps. This subspecies, like other species of Cyclura, is sexually dimorphic; males are larger than females, and have more prominent dorsal crests, "horns" and femoral pores on their thighs, which are used to release pheromones. Thomas Wiewandt, who spent an extended period on Mona Island studying C. stejnegeri, suggested that the horns, along with lateral spines and prominent parietal bulges, function as protective armor against sharp rocks or as defensive tools to facilitate the escape of males from the grasp of one another.

Habitat
Mona ground iguanas are diurnal and spend most of the day basking in the sun conserving energy. Mona ground iguanas are endemic to Mona Island; they are scattered through the entire island, though the southwest part of the island is only used during the nesting season. They live a considerable portion of their lives underground, and are usually found in talus slopes, caves and sinkhole depressions.

Reproduction

Although Mona ground iguanas use the whole island as their habitat, only 1% of the territory, located on the southwest coast, is suitable for nesting because it contains loose sand, and receives direct sunlight. The females bury their eggs in the sand, and the sunlight incubates the eggs.

Nesting season begins in the second week of June. Usually, one female mates with more than one male in the two weeks the mating season lasts. Copulation may last from 15 sec to 2 mins and 15 sec. One month later, nesting begins. They will guard their nests for several days, but provide no parental care for the hatchlings, which hatch three months later.

Diet
Mona ground iguanas, like most Cyclura  species, are primarily herbivorous, consuming leaves, flowers, berries, and fruits from different plant species. A study in 2000 by Dr Allison Alberts of the San Diego Zoo revealed that seeds passing through the digestive tracts of Cycluras germinate more rapidly than those that do not. These seeds in the fruits consumed by Cyclura have an adaptive advantage, by sprouting before the end of very short rainy seasons. The Mona ground iguana is also an important means of distributing these seeds to new areas (particularly since females migrate to nesting sites) and, as the largest native herbivores of their ecosystems, they are essential for maintaining the balance between climate and vegetation. Their diets are very rarely supplemented with insect larvae, crabs, slugs, dead birds, and fungi; individual animals do appear to be opportunistic carnivores. Fewer than a dozen animal species and 71 plant species are found in the Mona ground iguanas' diets. Mona ground iguanas eat the caterpillar of sphingid moths. These larvae feed on poisonous plants and are aposematically colored and avoided by other predators.

Endangered status
Population numbers are estimated at 1,500 with lower densities than similar iguana-inhabited islands in the West Indies. Immature iguanas are scarce and represent only 5–10% of the population, revealing that the population is aging and in decline.

Reasons for decline

Feral pigs pose the most serious threat as they root up iguana nests, and like most Cyclura species, the Mona ground iguana nests communally and at high density. Introduced goats and pigs are a major competitor for food and overbrowsing by goats also leads to loss of protective cover from birds of prey such as the osprey and predation of juveniles by feral cats.

Recovery efforts
A headstarting program was put into place by the Puerto Rico Department of Natural and Environmental Resources, with cooperation from the IUCN Iguana Specialist Group, the US Fish and Wildlife Service, the Toledo Zoo, and the University of Puerto Rico in 1999, to aid in the recovery of the Mona ground iguana. From within the safety of this program, the iguanas are reared until they are large enough to survive in the wild, and predators, such as pigs and feral cats, are no longer a threat. The facility also carries out health screening prior to the release of specimens. This health screening has been used to provide baselines of the normal physiologic values of the species, identifying potential future problems due to parasites, diseases, etc. which might threaten the population.

See also

Fauna of Puerto Rico
List of amphibians and reptiles of Puerto Rico
List of endemic fauna of Puerto Rico

References

External links

 Profile on Cyclura.com
 U.S. Fish and Wildlife Service
 Conservation Management Institute

Cyclura
Endemic fauna of Puerto Rico
iguana, Mona ground
Reptiles of Puerto Rico
Endangered fauna of North America
Endangered fauna of the United States
Reptiles described in 1916
Taxa named by Thomas Barbour
Taxa named by Gladwyn Kingsley Noble
ESA threatened species